Princess Jeokgyeong (died 1030) or posthumously called Princess Hyojeong, was a Goryeo Royal Princess as the eldest daughter of King Hyeonjong, from his second wife Queen Wonhwa who was the youngest daughter of King Seongjong. There was no records left about whether she married or where her tomb is.

References

Goryeo princesses
10th-century Korean women
11th-century Korean women
Year of birth unknown
1030 deaths